Overtime is the amount of time someone works beyond normal working hours.

Overtime may also refer to:

Sports
 Overtime (sports), an additional period of play to bring a game to a decision and avoid a tie or draw
 Overtime (ice hockey), a method of determining the winner of an ice hockey match when the scores are tied

Music
 "Overtime" (Ace Hood song), 2009
 "Overtime" (Level 42 song), 1991
 "Overtime" (Jessie Ware song), 2018
 Overtime (album), a 2005 album by the Dave Holland Big Band
 Over Time (album), an album by the band Hieroglyphics
 "Overtime", a song by Dale Bozzio on the 1988 album Riot in English
 "Overtime", a song by Willie Nelson and Lucinda Williams on the 2004 album Outlaws and Angels
 "Overtime", a 2012 song by Cash Cash

Organizations
 Overtime (sports network), a sports network startup cofounded by Zack Weiner and Dan Porter

Other uses
 Overtime (film) aka The Dead Are Alive, a 1972 film by Italian director Armando Crispino
 Overtime (novel), a 1993 humorous fantasy novel by Tom Holt
 Overtime, a series created by YouTube group Dude Perfect in 2018